3,322 candidates stood in the United Kingdom general election of 2019, which was held on 12 December 2019. The deadline for parties and individuals to file candidate nomination papers to the acting returning officer (and the deadline for candidates to withdraw) was 16:00 on 14 November 2019.

Gender
A record number of women took part, with 1,120 female candidates in total (34%). The election also saw the highest ever number of transgender and non-binary candidates, ten overall.

Political parties
The Conservative Party put forward the most candidates, standing in 635 of the UK's 650 seats. The Labour Party contested 631, the Liberal Democrats 611, the various Green parties (a total of 472), and the Brexit Party 275. The total number of candidates by party is shown below:

Withdrawn or disowned candidates 

The following candidates withdrew from campaigning or had support from their party withdrawn after the close of nominations and so will remain on the ballot paper in their constituency.

Notes

References

2019 United Kingdom general election
British political candidates